Nayenezgáni (sometimes spelled Naayééʼ Neizghání) is a mythical hero from Navajo mythology who, along with his brother Tobadzischini, rid the world of the Anaye. He is considered by some to be the Navajo god of war, although evidence for this is flimsy.

Etymology 
Nayenezgani is a Navajo word that can be translated to "Monster Slayer" or "Killer of Enemies".

Mythology

Birth 
Changing Woman (sometimes The White-Painted Woman or The White Shell Woman) became pregnant with her children after basking in the Sun God's rays while bathing in a pool of water. The giant Yeitso heard when the children were born and set out to kill and devour them. Changing Woman hid her sons and tried to convince Yeitso that it was mistaken. When questioned about the small footprints in the snow, Changing Woman replied saying that in her loneliness she made the footprints herself to pretend she has company.

Slaying Monsters 
After both brothers had matured they set out to destroy the Anaye, who were abominations born from "unnatural means" (specifically women having intercourse with objects instead of men). One of the earliest creatures they encountered was the Spider Woman (or the Spider Grandmother) who gave them each a feather that would defend them on their journey, which they used to protect themselves against multiple monsters (including giant birds, bears, and serpents).

Meeting the Sun God 
At one point, the brothers decided to visit their father, Tsohanoai (sometimes Jóhonaaʼéí), the God of the sun. The trials they have to go through are different depending on the version of the story, but most involve figuring out clever ways to climb up into the sky and get past the guards of the sun's house. Once they have proved themselves to their father, he gifts them weapons to help them kill the rest of the anaye, chief among them being a quiver full of lightning bolts.

Killing Yeitso 
Yeitso is described as the largest and most powerful of the anaye, usually the last to be killed by Nayenezgani. Whichever method is used to kill the giant, it almost always involves taunting it from a hiding place and striking a fatal blow with a lightning bolt.

In popular culture 

In the Buffy the Vampire Slayer universe, Nayenezgani appears as one of the slayers before Buffy.

Nayenezgani has briefly been mentioned in both Thor and Wonder Woman comics as a part of the Navajo pantheon.

References 

Deities of the indigenous peoples of North America
Navajo mythology
Heroes in mythology and legend